Following is a list of senators of Haute-Savoie, people who have represented the department of Haute-Savoie in the Senate of France.

Third Republic

Senators for Haute-Savoie under the French Third Republic were:

 Alfred Chardon (1876-1893)
 Louis Chaumontel (1876-1892)
 César Duval (1898-1909)
 Félix Francoz (1892-1900)
 André Folliet (1893-1905)
 Félix Francoz (1900-1909)
 Émile Chautemps (1905-1918
 César Duval (1910-1925)
 Émile Goy (1910-1920)
 Jules Mercier (1910-1920)
 Fernand David (1920-1935)
 Claudius Gallet (1920-1936)
 Hippolyte Curral (1925-1936)
 Paul Jacquier (1935-1944)
 Joseph Blanc (1936-1941)
 Félix Braise (1936-1942)

Fourth Republic

Senators for Haute-Savoie under the French Fourth Republic were:

 Charles Bosson (1946-1948)
 Amédée Guy (1946-1948)
 René Rosset (1946-1948)
 Jean Clerc (1948-1959)
 François Ruin (1948-1958)
 Arthur Lavy (1958-1959)

Fifth Republic 
Senators for Haute-Savoie under the French Fifth Republic:

References

Sources

 
Lists of members of the Senate (France) by department